The Battle of Pensacola (7-9 November 1814) was a battle of the Creek War during the War of 1812, in which American forces fought against forces from the kingdoms of Britain and Spain who were aided by the Creek Indians and African-American slaves allied with the British. General Andrew Jackson led his infantry against British and Spanish forces controlling the city of Pensacola in Spanish Florida. Allied forces abandoned the city, and the remaining Spanish forces surrendered to Jackson.

The battle was the only engagement of the war to take place within the sovereignty of the Kingdom of Spain, which was angered by the rapid withdrawal of British forces. Britain's naval squadron of five warships also withdrew from the city.

Background

Horseshoe Bend 
Many refugees fled to Spanish West Florida after the Red Stick Creeks were defeated at the Battle of Horseshoe Bend. The presence of the Creek refugees had motivated British Brevet Captain George Woodbine of the Royal Marines to travel to Pensacola in July 1814. Woodbine's liaisons with the refugees and the Spanish governor of Pensacola enabled the British to maintain a military presence at Pensacola from August 23, 1814, initially occupying Fort San Miguel and the town itself.  British relations deteriorated with the Spanish governor, so the British force left the town and consolidated in the outlying Fort San Carlos and at the Santa Rosa Punta de Siguenza battery (later rebuilt as Fort Pickens).

Gordon's expedition 
The armed Creeks at Horseshoe Bend prompted Jackson to send Tennessee militia Captain John Gordon to reconnoiter Pensacola and see if the British were using it as a base to arm Indians hostile to the United States. Gordon arrived at Pensacola to find the Union Jack flying at the fort and British officers training and arming Creek warriors. Gordon's son-in-law Felix Zollicoffer wrote of the excursion:
It was Capt. Gordon who performed that memorable and perilous service of penetrating alone a forest 300 miles from Hickory Grounds to Pensacola, encountering and evading various Indian parties, and procuring for Gen. Jackson that valuable knowledge of Spanish fortifications and of the Spanish complicity with British and Indian enemies which at once determined him upon and gave him the key to the famous capture of Pensacola.
Jackson decided to attack Pensacola based upon Gordon's report.

Preparations at Pensacola  
General Jackson planned to drive the British from Pensacola in Spanish Florida, then march to New Orleans to defend the city against any British attack. His forces had been diminished due to desertions, so he was forced to wait for Brigadier General John Coffee and his volunteers before moving against the city. Jackson and Coffee met at Pierce's Stockade in Alabama. Jackson assembled a force of up to 4,000 men; he moved out towards Pensacola on November 2 and reached it on November 6. The forces in the Anglo-Spanish fort consisted of around 100 British infantry and a coastal battery, about 500 Spanish infantry, an unknown number of British and Spanish artillery, and an unknown number of Creek warriors. Jackson first sent Major Henri Piere as a messenger under a white flag of truce to Spanish Governor Mateo González Manrique. However, the messenger approached the city and was fired upon by the garrison in Fort San Miguel. Jackson then sent a second messenger, this time a Spaniard, and offered to garrison the forts with Americans, who would hold them until relieved by Spanish troops; this would ensure Spain's neutrality in the conflict. Manrique rejected the offer.

Battle 
 At dawn, Jackson had 3,000 troops marching on the city.  The Americans flanked the city from the east to avoid fire from the forts and marched along the beachfront, but the sandy beach made it difficult to move up the artillery. The attack went ahead nonetheless and was met with resistance in the center of town by a line of infantry supported by a battery. However, the Americans charged and captured the battery.

Governor Manrique appeared with a white flag and agreed to surrender on any terms Jackson put forward if only he would spare the town. Fort San Miguel was surrendered on November 7, but Fort San Carlos, which lay 14 miles to the west, remained in British hands.

A number of Spanish accompanied the retreating British forces and did not return to Pensacola until 1815.

Aftermath
The battle had forced the British out of Pensacola and left the Spanish in control, angered by the British, who had fled in such a hurry once Jackson's force had attacked, for their destruction of the fortifications and the removal of part of the Spanish garrison. Jackson suspected the squadron which had left Pensacola harbor would return to strike at Mobile, Alabama. Jackson abandoned Pensacola to the Spanish and set out to Mobile, and upon reaching the town he received requests to hurry to the defense of New Orleans. American casualties were negligible; around seven dead and eleven wounded. (Two officers and nine enlisted men wounded are documented by Eaton.) The Spanish and British suffered at least 15 dead or wounded. Lieutenant Colonel Edward Nicolls states there were no deaths among the British, and is of the opinion that the Americans suffered 15 fatalities and numerous casualties.

Four active infantry battalions of the Regular Army (1-1 Inf, 2-1 Inf, 2-7 Inf and 3-7 Inf) perpetuate the lineages of American units (elements of the old 3rd, 39th and 44th Infantry Regiments) that were at the Battle of Pensacola.

See also
First Battle of Fort Bowyer

Notes

References
 
 
 Heidler, David Stephen & Jeanne T (2003): Old Hickory's War: Andrew Jackson and the Quest for Empire. Louisiana State University Press. 
 Hyde, Samuel C. (2004): A Fierce and Fractious Frontier: The Curious Development of Louisiana's Florida Parishes, 1699–2000. Louisiana State University Press. 
 Mahon, John K. (1991): The War Of 1812. Da Capo Press. 
 Marshall, John (1829): Royal Naval Biography. Longman, Hurst, Rees, Orme, and Brown.

 Nicolas, Paul Harris (1845): Historical Record of the Royal Marine Forces. Volume 2, 1805–1842
 
 
 Tucker, Spencer (ed). (2012): The Encyclopedia of the War of 1812: A Political, Social, and Military History. ABC-CLIO. 

1814 in the United States
Conflicts in 1814
Pensacola (1814)
Spanish Florida
Andrew Jackson
History of Pensacola, Florida
Battles involving Spain
Battles involving the United Kingdom
Battles involving the United States
November 1814 events
Pensacola